Heversham railway station served the village of Heversham, near Carnforth, with trains to Kendal and Grange over Sands along the Hincaster branch line.

History 
Heversham was opened by the Furness Railway in 1890, before being officially part of the London and North Western Railway. However, the station was passed to the London, Midland and Scottish Railway during the Grouping of 1923, only to be closed nineteen years later on 4 May 1942. Four trains were set to run each way. A popular train ran through the station, called the Kendal Tommy, which linked Grange-over-Sands with Kendal. After passenger services ceased, typically six-eight freight trains chugged past the station each day until the line closed in 1966.

The site today 
The trackbed is now a footpath and the platform is still visible. The station was demolished.

References

Disused railway stations in Cumbria
Railway stations in Great Britain closed in 1942
Railway stations in Great Britain opened in 1890
Former Furness Railway stations